Merdanya is a village in Northern Bulgaria. The village is located in Lyaskovets Municipality, Veliko Tarnovo Province. Аccording to the numbers provided by the 2020 Bulgarian census, Dzhulunitsa currently has a population of 602 people with a permanent address registration in the settlement.

Geography 
Merdanya village is located in Northern Bulgaria and takes part of the Elena Balkan, a well-developed touristic area.

The elevation in the village varies between 100 and 300 meters with an average of 254 meters. The climate of the village is continental. It lies on the borders of the Balkan Mountains and the Danubian Plain (Bulgaria).

There is a very well-developed vegetable production, viticulture, and fruit growing in the village.

Culture 
There is a centuries-old monastery located in the western part of Merdanya known as the Merdanya Monastery.

The monastery “Sv Chetiridiset Matchenitsi” is located 14 kilometers southeast from Veliko Tarnovo, in the western end of Merdanya village.

It was built during the 13th century and rebuilt in the 19th century. It is an acting women's monastery as of now.

The village's festival is held on the 26th of October each year, Dimitrovden. It is the same day the local church honors its saint-patron.

Ethnicity 
According to the Bulgarian population census in 2011.

References 

Villages in Veliko Tarnovo Province